The Alstom PL42AC is a class of four axle B-B diesel-electric locomotive designed by Alstom in association with GM-EMD. 33 were built between 2003 and 2006 for NJ Transit Rail Operations.

Description 
The PL42AC is a diesel-electric 4-axle locomotive built by Alstom with 16-710G3B prime mover  for New Jersey Transit. The first two locomotives were manufactured at the Meinfesa plant in Valencia, Spain in 2003. The 31 following units were assembled at the Alstom Transport plant in Hornell, New York in 2004, and were produced through early 2006. The power rating of the PL42AC locomotives is 4,200 hp (3.1 MW) total for tractive effort and head-end power. The locomotive has a design similar to the GE Genesis, mainly due to the fact that both PL42AC and Genesis series locomotives were designed by industrial designer Cesar Vergara.

This locomotive uses IGBT technology with precise traction computers for tractive effort. The PL42AC has 800 kilowatts head-end power and WABCO's EPIC II braking system, along with an E-7 wheel slide device, made by Wabtec, preventing flats spots on the wheels through software and hardware.

It has an Intelligent Display Unit (IDU) based on Bombardier Transportation technology from which an engineer or technician can view data or download events and faults from the previous weeks or months. The technician can do a host of tests from the IDU to determine if a specific system is operating correctly.

The PL42AC uses computer hardware and software to control functions and to protect the engine.  For example, if the on-board computer detects too little oil in the system, it will shut down the engine to avoid damage.

Future 
In July 2020, NJ Transit announced that older locomotives in the PL42AC fleet will be replaced by  additional ALP-45A dual mode locomotives, due to the PL42AC's unreliability and inability to be upgraded to meet new Environmental Protection Agency standards. Of the 33 units, 23 are slated for replacement, while the remaining 10 would instead receive a light overhaul for continued service.

References 

Bo-Bo locomotives
NJ Transit Rail Operations
PL42AC
Passenger locomotives
Railway locomotives introduced in 2003
PL42AC
Standard gauge locomotives of the United States